Semalea pulvina, the silky dart, silky skipper or branded silky skipper, is a butterfly in the family Hesperiidae. It is found in Senegal, Guinea-Bissau, Guinea, Sierra Leone, Liberia, Ivory Coast, Ghana, Togo, Nigeria, Cameroon, Gabon, the Republic of the Congo, the Democratic Republic of the Congo, Uganda, western Kenya, Tanzania, Malawi, northern Zambia, Mozambique and eastern Zimbabwe. The habitat consists of forests.

Adults have been recorded feeding on blossoms of Syzygium cordatum. They are on wing from August to September and from February to May.

The larvae feed on Siphonochilus aethiopicus and Aframomum species.

References

Butterflies described in 1879
Erionotini
Butterflies of Africa